This is a partial list of awareness ribbons. The meaning behind an awareness ribbon depends on its colors and pattern. Since many advocacy groups have adopted ribbons as symbols of support or awareness, ribbons, particularly those of a single color, some colors may refer to more than one cause. Some causes may be represented by more than one ribbon.

Colors and meanings

See also
 Awareness campaign
 Political colour

References

External links
 

Death-related lists
Human diseases and disorders